Jana Krausová (born 25 January 1954) is a Czech actress. She was formerly married to actor Jan Kraus. Krausová is also an experienced artist, having presented works in art exhibitions both in the Czech Republic and abroad. Krausová is a long-term theatre collaborator with Karel Roden, having worked together on seven plays since starring together in the 2002 Czech version of the Dario Fo production The Open Couple.

At the moment she can be found at Theatre Studio DVA in several performances.

Selected filmography
Scalpel, Please (1985)
Helluva Good Luck (1999)
Ulice (television, 2005)
Pleasant Moments (2006)
Kajínek (2010)
The Magical Duvet (2011)
Family Film (2015)

References

External links

1954 births
Living people
Artists from Prague
Czech women artists
Czech television actresses
Czech film actresses
Czech stage actresses
20th-century Czech actresses
21st-century Czech actresses